Sineserye Presents is a Philippine primetime soap opera broadcast by ABS-CBN. It literally means a film serialized to a TV series which is the show's concept.

Origins
In 2005, ABS-CBN first used the term Sineserye when they launched the television series, Panday. They used it again when they aired the television series version of Bituing Walang Ningning. Kampanerang Kuba is also considered a Sineserye, although the said network called it a fantaserye. After 2 years of airing, ABS-CBN declared that Sineserye Presents has been officially cancelled on October 2, 2009, then two weeks ago the network decided to make a new afternoon drama for daytime Nagsimula sa Puso premiering October 12 until it ended on January 22, 2010.

Programs

Season One

Palimos ng Pag-ibig

Hiram Na Mukha

May Minamahal

Natutulog Ba ang Diyos?

Season Two: The Susan Roces Cinema Collection

Patayin sa Sindak si Barbara

Maligno

Florinda

See also
List of programs broadcast by ABS-CBN
List of shows previously aired by ABS-CBN

External links
 

Philippine anthology television series
2007 Philippine television series debuts
2009 Philippine television series endings
ABS-CBN original programming
Television series by Dreamscape Entertainment Television
Television series by Star Creatives
Filipino-language television shows